This is a list of lighthouses and lightvessels in Australia.

The first lighthouse was Macquarie Lighthouse, which was lit in 1793 as a tripod mounted wood and coal fired beacon. The last staffed lighthouse was Maatsuyker Island Lighthouse, off the south coast of Tasmania, which was automated in 1996.

Listing
The lighthouses and lightvessels of Australia are listed in the National Geospatial-Intelligence Agency List of Lights publication 111. They are listed by the United Kingdom Hydrographic Office on volume K of the Admiralty List of Lights & Fog Signals. The ARLHS World List of Lights lists them with the prefix "AUS".

On The Lighthouse Directory, the lighthouses of Australia are listed according to their location:
 Coral Sea Islands Territory
 New South Wales, including Cape St George Lighthouse which is in Jervis Bay Territory.
 Northern Territory
 Queensland's East Coast, from Townsville southwards
 Far North Queensland
 South Australia
 Tasmania
 Victoria
 Western Australia

Another listing is held by Lighthouses of Australia Inc., which lists lighthouses by state
 Western Australia
 Northern Territory
 South Australia
 Queensland
 New South Wales
 Victoria
 Tasmania

Another list exists at Australian Lighthouses, a website which includes both an A-Z list and a list by state.

A list also exists at SeaSide Lights, which lists lighthouses by state:
 Western Australia
 Northern Territory
 South Australia
 Queensland
 New South Wales
 Victoria
 Tasmania

In order to be listed below, an active lighthouse has to appear at least in one of The Lighthouse Directory, Lighthouses of Australia Inc. or SeaSide Lights. Other lists mentioned above include many lights which are hard to describe as "lighthouses". Historical lighthouses were sometimes included when they are mentioned in other reliable sources.

Management
Most of the lighthouses and lightvessels in Australia are managed by the Australian Maritime Safety Authority (AMSA), though the AMSA usually only manages the lighting equipment, with local authorities managing the lighthouses and parklands. In New South Wales the lighthouses and parklands are mostly managed by the Department of Environment, Climate Change and Water or the New South Wales Department of Lands. In the Northern Territory some of the lighthouses are managed by the Darwin Port Corporation. In South Australia some of the stations are managed by the Department of Environment, Water and Natural Resources. In Tasmania, many lighthouses are managed by the Tasmania Parks and Wildlife Service. In Victoria, harbour aids are maintained by the Port of Melbourne Corporation in the Melbourne area and by the Victorian Regional Channels Authority elsewhere, while parklands are mostly managed by Parks Victoria. In Western Australia some of the stations are managed by the Department of Environment and Conservation.

Lighthouses by state or territory

Jervis Bay Territory

New South Wales
There are several lighthouse siblings in the vicinity – lighthouses that were designed by the same architect around the same time, which are very similar by design. These include:
 Wollongong Breakwater Lighthouse and Warden Head Light, built 1872–1873, initiated by Edward Orpen Moriarty MA MInstCE
 Crowdy Head Light, Fingal Head Light, Clarence River Light (the original, now demolished), Tacking Point Lighthouse and Richmond River Light, designed by James Barnet in 1878
 Point Perpendicular Light (1899), Cape Byron Light (1901) and Norah Head Light (1903), designed by Charles Assinder Harding
 Bradleys Head Light (1905) and Robertson Point Light (1910)
 The "Disney Castles", Grotto Point Light, Parriwi Head Light, Vaucluse Bay Range Front Light and Vaucluse Bay Range Rear Light, built 1910–1911 by Maurice Festu
 The "Wedding Cakes", Eastern Channel Pile Light and Western Channel Pile Light built in 1924

Northern Territory
Most of the lighthouses in the Northern Territory were constructed by the Commonwealth Lighthouse Service during the "Golden Age of Australian Lighthouses", between 1913 and 1920. These include Cape Don Light, East Vernon Light, Emery Point Light, Cape Hotham Light and Cape Fourcroy.

Of these five, three can be considered "siblings", Cape Hotham Light, Emery Point Light and Cape Fourcroy Light. They are almost identical white square skeletal towers, and they also share a similar light characteristic, three flashes every 15 second (Fl.(3) 15s).

Queensland
Most lighthouses in Queensland were constructed in well established groups:
 Two lighthouses constructed using bolted prefabricated segments of cast iron: Sandy Cape Light and Bustard Head Light.
 Eight lighthouses made of hardwood frame clad with corrugated iron: Little Sea Hill Light, Grassy Hill Light, Goods Island Light, Bay Rock Light, Old Caloundra Light, North Point Hummock Light (demolished), Gatcombe Head Light (demolished) and Bulwer Island Light.
 Seven concrete towers erected between 1964 and 1979: Cape Capricorn Light, New Caloundra Light, Point Danger Light, New Burnett Heads Light, Fitzroy Island Light, Point Cartwright Light and Archer Point Light.

South Australia

Tasmania

Victoria

Western Australia

See also
List of lighthouses in the Coral Sea Islands
Lists of lighthouses

References

External links

Lighthouses Australia Inc.  a non-profit organisation which aims to create a higher profile for Australian lighthouses.
West Australian Lighthouse website
Australian and Oceania Lighthouses A private web site by Kevin Mulcahy  containing lists of Oceania Lighthouses with data taken from The British Admiralty vol K List of Lighthouses and Foghorns.
 

 
Australia
Lighthouses
Lighthouses
Lists of tourist attractions in Australia